WQUS (103.1 FM, "U.S. 103.1") is a commercial FM radio station licensed to Lapeer, Michigan, and broadcasting a classic rock radio format.  It is owned by Townsquare Media and the home of two local sports teams: the Ontario Hockey League's Flint Firebirds and Lapeer Lightning high school football.

WQUS has an effective radiated power (ERP) of 2,600 watts.  The transmitter is on Haines Road in Lum, Michigan.  The studios are in Burton, east of Flint.

History
The original call sign was WTHM-FM. For many years it simulcast its AM sister station WTHM (now as WLCO). The call letters stood for "The Thumb" area of east central Michigan. WTHM-AM-FM was a full-service station featuring middle of the road (MOR) and adult contemporary music, along with local news and sports. WTHM-FM allowed Lapeer residents to have local radio service after its daytime-only AM station was mandated to sign off at sunset. Later on, the call letters were switched to WDEY-AM-FM. The format remained full service AC.

WDEY-AM-FM were owned for many years by James Sommerville, who sold both to Covenant Communications in 1991.  Five years following the acquisition by Covenant, the FM station, by this time known as WWGZ-FM (Wings 103), had switched to an album rock format and became more of a regional station, serving listeners in Flint.  The AM station adopted a sports radio format and the new call letters WLSP.  It later flipped to a talk radio format and then adult standards prior to becoming an affiliate of the "Real Country" network as WLCO.  

In 1998 WWGZ-FM changed its call sign to WRXF (Radio X) and took on a more Active Rock/Heavy metal sound. One Radio X veteran, Tony LaBrie, later became the Music Director and DJ at 103.1 FM's sister station WWBN.

Both WLSP-AM and WRXF-FM were sold in December 2001 to Regent Communications (now Townsquare Media) for $1.3 million.  Shortly after the transaction was announced, WRXF ended its independent programming and became a simulcast of its new FM sister station, WWBN "Banana 101.5".  The simulcast ended almost three months later, when 103.1 once again became independently programmed, under its present call letters, format and moniker.

Both stations then moved from their longtime location at 286 West Nepessing Street in Lapeer to join their co-owned Regent sister stations at G-3338 East Bristol Road in the Flint suburb of Burton.

U.S. 103.1's format has a base of Classic Rock and Classic Hits, but the station also plays some alternative rock and other rock songs from the 1990s.

Sources
Michiguide.com - WQUS History

References

External links

QUS-FM
Classic rock radio stations in the United States
Radio stations established in 1968
Townsquare Media radio stations